The 1942 Navy Midshipmen football team represented the United States Naval Academy during the 1942 college football season. In their first season under head coach John Whelchel, the Midshipmen compiled a 5–4 record, shut out five opponents and outscored all opponents by a combined score of 82 to 58.

Schedule

References

Navy
Navy Midshipmen football seasons
Navy Midshipmen football